The canton of Mâcon-1 is an administrative division of the Saône-et-Loire department, eastern France. It was created at the French canton reorganisation which came into effect in March 2015. Its seat is in Mâcon.

It consists of the following communes:
Charnay-lès-Mâcon
Mâcon (partly)
Sancé

References

Cantons of Saône-et-Loire